The Colonial Theatre is a historic movie theater located at Canton, Haywood County, North Carolina. It was designed by Benton & Benton and built in 1932.  It is a 2 1/2-story, five bay Colonial Revival style brick building.  The theater auditorium has 650 seats, including the auditorium and the balcony. The Colonial Theater has been renovated and is now used for concerts, movies, and plays.

It was listed on the National Register of Historic Places in 2000. It is located in the Canton Main Street Historic District.

References

External links
Cinema Treasures

Theatres completed in 1932
Theatres on the National Register of Historic Places in North Carolina
Colonial Revival architecture in North Carolina
Buildings and structures in Haywood County, North Carolina
National Register of Historic Places in Haywood County, North Carolina
Historic district contributing properties in North Carolina